Yablunivka   is a village in Shepetivka Raion (district) of Khmelnytskyi Oblast (province) in western Ukraine. The village is located in the north of Khmelnytskyi Oblast, on the border from the Zhytomyr Oblast. It belongs to Berezdiv rural hromada, one of the hromadas of Ukraine. The population of the village is around 567 persons.

Until 18 July 2020, Yablunivka belonged to Slavuta Raion. The raion was abolished in July 2020 as part of the administrative reform of Ukraine, which reduced the number of raions of Khmelnytskyi Oblast to three. The area of Slavuta Raion was abolished and merged into Shepetivka Raion.

The Maniatynska village council forms the local government.
The regional psychiatric hospital is located in the village.

References

External links 
  weather.in.ua

Villages in Sheptivka Raion